The Lake Front Depot was a train station in Milwaukee, Wisconsin built in 1889–1890 by the Chicago and North Western Railway (C&NW). It was located near the shore of Lake Michigan at the end of East Wisconsin Avenue, by today's Milwaukee County War Memorial. The depot cost $200,000 to build at the time, and eventually served 98 trains a day.

Chicago and North Western owned the depot until 1964 when Milwaukee County bought the structure and surrounding land for $7 million, with the intent to use the land for a freeway.  C&NW continued to use the depot until May 15, 1966 when trains were moved to the new Union Station (now the Milwaukee Intermodal Station) after it was built by the Chicago, Milwaukee, St. Paul and Pacific Railroad (Milwaukee Road).  The Milwaukee Road had itself vacated its old Everett Street Depot the previous year.

The Lake Front Depot lasted two more years until 1968.  Some efforts were made to save the building from being torn down, but they were unable to raise the needed money.  Estimates ranged from $325,000 to restore the structure to $575,000 to move it to another location.

Many of the C&NW's "400" trains served this station starting in 1935.  In the early days of the Twin Cities 400, the steam locomotives which pulled the train were exchanged at the Milwaukee station.  The engines ran at such high speeds on the route from Chicago to Minneapolis–Saint Paul that some components in the drivetrain couldn't withstand the  trip.  The railroad eventually got the exchange process down to a very quick five minutes.

Other trains to serve the depot included the Flambeau 400, Peninsula 400, and Valley 400.

References

Buildings and structures in Milwaukee
Former Chicago and North Western Railway stations
Demolished railway stations in the United States
Railway stations in the United States opened in 1889
Railway stations closed in 1966
Former railway stations in Wisconsin
1966 disestablishments in Wisconsin
1889 establishments in Wisconsin
Charles Sumner Frost buildings